Sambailo Airport  is an airport serving Koundara, a town in the Boké Region of Guinea.

The Sambailo non-directional beacon (Ident: SB) is located on the field.

See also

Transport in Guinea
List of airports in Guinea

References

External links
 OurAirports - Sambailo Airport
 OpenStreetMap - Sambailo Airport
 FallingRain - Sambailo Airport

 Google Earth

Airports in Guinea